Dorcadion stephaniae is a species of beetle in the family Cerambycidae. It was described by Pesarini and Sabbadini in 2003. It is known from Greece.

References

stephaniae
Beetles described in 2003